Sergey Yesenin class is a class of Russian river passenger ships. It is named after Sergei Yesenin.

Three-deck cruise ships built in Austria, 1984–1986.

River cruise ships of the Austrian project Q-065

Overview

See also
 List of river cruise ships
 Valerian Kuybyshev-class motorship
 Rossiya class (project 785) motorship
 Rossiya class (project 1877) motorship
 Anton Chekhov-class motorship
 Vladimir Ilyich-class motorship
 Rodina-class motorship
 Baykal-class motorship
 Dmitriy Furmanov-class motorship
 Maksim Gorkiy-class motorship

References

External links

 Тип Сергей Есенин Проекты PV08, Q-065 
 Project Q-065

River cruise ships
Ships of Russia
Ships of the Soviet Union
Austria–Soviet Union relations